Pál Balkay (1785–1846) was a Hungarian painter and teacher best known for his portrait of "The Sister and Brother". 

Balkay was born in Tiszaörs and died in Eger. He lived and worked in what was then the Austrian Empire.

Gallery

References

1785 births
1846 deaths
People from Tiszaörs
Hungarian painters
Painters from the Austrian Empire